Groundwater's keelback (Hebius groundwateri) is a species of snake in the family Colubridae. The species is endemic to southern Thailand.

Etymology
The specific name, groundwateri, is in honor of zoological illustrator Mr. C.L. Groundwater.

Geographic range
It is found in Ranong Province, Thailand.

Reproduction
It is oviparous.

References

Further reading
Smith MA (1922). "Notes on Reptiles and Batrachians from Siam and Indo-China, (No. 1)". J. Nat. Hist. Soc. Siam 4 (4): 203-214 + Plate 8. (Natrix groundwateri, new species, pp. 205–206 + Plate 8, figure 2).
Taylor EH (1965). "The Serpents of Thailand and Adjacent Waters". Univ. Kansas Sci. Bull. 65 (9): 609–1096. (Natrix groundwateri, pp. 827–828).

Reptiles described in 1922
Taxa named by Malcolm Arthur Smith
Reptiles of Thailand
Hebius